The 1928–1929 SM-Sarja season was the second season of the Finnish SM-sarja. Like the season before the 1928–29 season was played as a cup.

Qualifications

Semi-finals 

HPS and HJK through to the Final.

Final 

Helsingin Jalkapalloklubi wins the 1929 Finnish Ice Hockey Championship.

References
 Hockey Archives
 SJHS

Liiga seasons
1928–29 in Finnish ice hockey
Fin